Eupithecia leucospila is a moth in the family Geometridae first described by Charles Swinhoe in 1906. It is found in the Indian state of Assam and in Thailand.

References

Moths described in 1906
leucospila
Moths of Asia